Village Creek is a stream in Madison County in the U.S. state of Missouri. It is a tributary of the Little Saint Francis River.

Village Creek was so named for the fact it flowed past the original town site of Saint Michel village.

See also
List of rivers of Missouri

References

Rivers of Madison County, Missouri
Rivers of Missouri